Sewo Olonilua (born November 27, 1997) is an American football fullback for the Houston Roughnecks of the XFL. He played college football at TCU.

Early years 
Olonilua attended Kingwood High School. He played as a running back in his four seasons and also started two-ways as an outside linebacker beginning as a junior. As a senior, he registered 1,073 rushing yards (11.4-yard avg.) and 14 touchdowns. He played in the U.S. Army All-American Bowl and received the Glenn Davis Army Award.

He was a four-star recruit coming out of high school and committed to play football at Texas Christian University, turning down offers from LSU, Oklahoma and Texas A&M.

College career 
Olonilua accepted a football scholarship from Texas Christian University. As a true freshman, he appeared in all 13 games, with his only start coming in the Liberty Bowl. During the season he had 15 carries for 122 rushing yards and one touchdown.

As a sophomore, he appeared in all 14 games, making 64 carries for 330 yards, 7 touchdowns, 19 receptions for 166 yards and 5 special teams tackles.

As a junior, he appeared in all 13 games, leading the team with 135 carries for 635 yards (4.7-yard avg.). He was named the Cheez-It Bowl Offensive Most Valuable Player after rushing for a TCU bowl record 194 yards.

As a senior, he was third on the team with 537 yards (4.0-yard avg.) and had 8 rushing touchdowns (led the team). He tallied 18 carries for 106 yards and one touchdown against Purdue University.

Professional career

Dallas Cowboys
Olonilua was signed as an undrafted free agent by the Dallas Cowboys after the 2020 NFL Draft on April 27. He was waived on September 5, 2020, and signed to the practice squad the next day. He was elevated to the active roster on November 7 and December 19 for the team's weeks 9 and 15 games against the Pittsburgh Steelers and San Francisco 49ers, and reverted to the practice squad after each game. He was promoted to the active roster on December 26, 2020.

On August 17, 2021, Olonilua was placed on season-ending injured reserve with a neck injury. On May 4, 2022, he was released after the Cowboys signed fullback Ryan Nall.

Houston Roughnecks
The Houston Roughnecks selected Olonilua in the sixth round of the 2023 XFL Supplemental Draft on January 1, 2023.

References

External links
 TCU Horned Frogs bio

1997 births
Living people
People from Kingwood, Texas
Players of American football from Texas
American football running backs
TCU Horned Frogs football players
Dallas Cowboys players
Houston Roughnecks players